Johannes Hester Lambertus Terwogt (18 May 1878 in Oude Wetering – 22 January 1977 in Amsterdam) was a Dutch rower who competed in the 1900 Summer Olympics.

He was part of the Dutch boat Minerva Amsterdam, which won the silver medal in the coxed fours final B.

References

External links

 profile

1878 births
1977 deaths
Dutch male rowers
Olympic rowers of the Netherlands
Rowers at the 1900 Summer Olympics
Olympic silver medalists for the Netherlands
People from Kaag en Braassem
Olympic medalists in rowing
Medalists at the 1900 Summer Olympics
Sportspeople from South Holland